Poulpeasty, officially Pollpeasty, is a small village in the west of County Wexford, Ireland.

History and development
The village and surrounding area were once part of the large estate of the Carew family in the nearby, but now ruined, Castleboro House.

Today, the village contains a primary school, a Roman Catholic church, and a small number of houses. The local Gaelic Athletic Association club is the Cloughbawn GAA Club.

People
Aidan O'Brien, race horse trainer, was born and raised in Poulpeasty. He attended the local primary school St Joseph's Donard N.S.

See also
 List of towns and villages in Ireland

References & footnotes

Towns and villages in County Wexford